Kelly Subbanand Rao (born 17 January 1963) is an Indian sailor. He competed in the men's 470 event at the 1988 Summer Olympics.

References

External links
 

1963 births
Living people
Indian male sailors (sport)
Olympic sailors of India
Sailors at the 1988 Summer Olympics – 470
Place of birth missing (living people)
Asian Games medalists in sailing
Sailors at the 1994 Asian Games
Medalists at the 1994 Asian Games
Asian Games bronze medalists for India
Recipients of the Arjuna Award